HASTAC (/ˈhāˌstak/'), also known as the Humanities, Arts, Science and Technology Alliance and Collaboratory, is a virtual organization and platform of more than 18,000 individuals and 400+ affiliate-institutions dedicated to innovative new modes of learning and research.  HASTAC network members contribute to the community by sharing work and ideas with others via the open-access website, by hosting HASTAC conferences and workshops online or in their region by initiating conversations, or by working collaboratively with others in the HASTAC network.

Until 2016, HASTAC administered the annual $2 million MacArthur Foundation Digital Media and Learning Competition. The 2011 Competition, “Badges for Lifelong Learning,” launched in collaboration with the Mozilla Foundation, focused on digital badges as a means to inspire learning, confirm accomplishment, or validate the acquisition of knowledge or skills.

HASTAC has been funded by Digital Promise, the National Science Foundation, the John D. and Catherine T. MacArthur Foundation, Duke University and Arizona State University. As of 2021, it is jointly administered and funded by The Graduate Center, CUNY and Dartmouth College.

Founding 
HASTAC was founded in 2002 by Cathy N. Davidson, Ruth F. DeVarney Professor of English, John Hope Franklin Humanities Institute Professor of Interdisciplinary Studies and co-director of the PhD Lab in Digital Knowledge at Duke University and co-founder of the John Hope Franklin Humanities Institute at Duke University, and David Theo Goldberg, Director of the University of California's statewide Humanities Research Institute (UCHRI).

At a meeting of humanities leaders held by the Mellon Foundation in 2002, it was clear that Davidson and Goldberg had each, independently, been working on a variety of projects with leading scientists and engineers dedicated to expanding the innovative uses of technology in research, teaching, and electronic publishing.  They resolved to contact others who were building and analyzing the social and ethical dimensions of new technologies and soon formed the HASTAC consortium with a dozen or so other noted educators, scientists, and technology designers.

Currently, HASTAC is governed by a Steering Committee of individuals from different institutions and disciplines.

Membership

According to its website, “HASTAC members are motivated by the conviction that the digital era provides rich opportunities for informal and formal learning and for collaborative, networked research that extends across traditional disciplines, across the boundaries of the academy and the community, across the "two cultures" of humanism and technology, across the divide of thinking versus making, and across social strata and national borders."

HASTAC's members include professors, students, public intellectuals, artists, educators, software or hardware designers, scientists, gamers, programmers, librarians, and social and political organizers. Specializations include the full range of the humanities and social sciences, the arts, journalism, digital humanities, computational fields, sciences, information science, and engineering, plus those interested in intellectual property issues  and public policy on a local or global scale.

Programs

HASTAC Scholars program 
In 2008, HASTAC initiated the HASTAC Scholars Program, an annual fellowship program that recognizes graduate and undergraduate students who are engaged in innovative work across the areas of technology, the arts, the humanities, and the social sciences. As of 2021, over 1,800 people from 260 institutions have been named HASTAC Scholars, functioning as links between their home institutions and the virtual community they foster on the HASTAC site. "HASTAC scholars participate in and encourage conversations often by blogging, tweeting, podcasting, or co-hosting forums with HASTAC scholars
from other universities, among other various means of connection".

HASTAC/MacArthur Foundation Digital Media and Learning Competition 
Created in 2007, the HASTAC/MacArthur Foundation Digital Media and Learning Competition  is designed to find and inspire the most innovative uses of new media in support of connected learning.  Awards have recognized individuals, for-profit companies, universities, and community organizations using new media to transform learning. Information about Digital Media and Learning Competition winners can be found on HASTAC.

The Digital Media and Learning Competition is funded by the MacArthur Foundation and administered by HASTAC. For the fourth competition, other partners included the Bill & Melinda Gates Foundation and Mozilla.

Digital Publication Projects 
Digital Publication Projects: Michigan Series in Digital Humanities@digitalculturebooks and the UM/HASTAC Digital Humanities Publication Prize
The University of Michigan Press and HASTAC launched The University of Michigan Series in Digital Humanities@digitalculturebooks and the UM/HASTAC Digital Humanities Publication Prize in December 2009.  Series editors include Julie Thompson Klein and Tara McPherson; advisory board includes Cathy N. Davidson, Daniel Herwitz, and Wendy Chun (Brown). 
  Initial 2012 winners were Jentery Sayers and Sheila Brennan.

Events

Conferences 
HASTAC member organizations organize international conferences for the community.

 Eight HASTAC member institutions coordinated InFORMATION Year in 2006–2007, a year of webcast programming each focusing on a theme for one month (InCommon, InCommunity, Interplay, Interaction, InJustice, Integration, Invitation and Innovation).  All culminated in Electronic Techtonics an international Interface conference cohosted by Duke University and RENCI (the Renaissance Computing Institute) on April 19–21, 2007. All events were webcast and archived versions are available free on hastac.org for nonprofit educational purposes. 
 HASTAC II: Techno-Travels was held in 2008 at University of California Humanities Research Institute (UCHRI); University of California, Irvine; and the University of California, Los Angeles.
 HASTAC III: Traversing Digital Boundaries was organized by the Institute for Computing in Humanities, Arts, and Social Science (I-CHASS) at the University of Illinois at Urbana-Champaign.
 HASTAC 2010: Grand Challenges and Global Innovations hosted by I-CHASS was a free, entirely virtual event held in a multiplicity of digital spaces instigated from sites across the globe.
 HASTAC 2011: Digital Scholarly Communication was held at the University of Michigan at Ann Arbor. (digital proceedings)
 HASTAC 2013: The Storm of Progress was held at York University and in downtown Toronto, Canada on April 25–28, 2013.
HASTAC 2014: Hemispheric Pathways - Critical Makers in International Networks was hosted by the Peruvian Ministry of Culture held in Lima, Peru.
HASTAC 2015: Exploring the Art & Science of Digital Humanities was held at the Kellog Center of Michigan State University.
HASTAC 2016: Impact, Variation, Innovation, Action was held at the Arizona State University's Nexus Lab in Tempe, AZ.
HASTAC 2017: The Possible Worlds of Digital Humanities was held in Orlando, Florida. Sponsored and organized by  the Florida Digital Humanities Consortium (FLDH.org)
HASTAC 2019: Decolonizing Technologies, Reprogramming Education  was held in partnership with the Institute for Critical Indigenous Studies at the University of British Columbia and the Department of English at the University of Victoria. 
HASTAC 2020: "Hindsight, Foresight, Insight" was planned to be led by Dean Anne Balsamo, and held at the University of Texas in Dallas, but due to COVID-19, has been canceled.
HASTAC 2023: Critical Making & Social Justice is scheduled to take place at Pratt Institute on June 8–10, 2023.

Mozilla's Drumbeat Festival: Learning, Freedom and the Open Web 
HASTAC hosted the "Storming the Academy" tent, which discussed and workshopped open learning and peer-to-peer assessment strategies, ideas, and lessons, at the Mozilla Drumbeat Festival in Barcelona on Nov. 3–5, 2010.

THATCampRTP 
On October 16, 2010, HASTAC hosted and helped to organize THATCamp RTP at Duke University's John Hope Franklin Humanities Institute.  It was the first area  THATCamp  for the Research Triangle Park area of North Carolina.

Peer-to-Peer Pedagogy: Workshop on Collaborative Learning Across Disciplines, Ages, and Institutions in Higher Education 
HASTAC held a public workshop on September 10, 2010, at the John Hope Franklin Center at Duke University. It included an "unpanel," an unconference, and breakout sessions during which participants discussed, explored and modeled the benefits and challenges of peer-to-peer collaborative pedagogies from the specific perspective of young scholars, emphasizing evaluation and grading. Participants included academics, practitioners, and HASTAC Scholars.

References

Information technology organizations
Digital humanities
Humanities organizations
Computing and society